The 2021–22 Logan Cup was the 28th edition of the Logan Cup, a first-class cricket competition in Zimbabwe, which started on 15 October 2021. Twenty matches were played, with the tournament concluding on 21 February 2022. The Rocks were the defending champions. Tuskers won the tournament, after their nearest rivals, Mountaineers, were beaten by the Rocks in the final round of matches. Tuskers last won the tournament in the 2014–15 season.

Points table

 Champions

10 points for a win, 5 points for a draw, 0 points for a loss

Fixtures

Statistics

Most Runs

Most Wickets

References

External links
 Series home at ESPN Cricinfo

Logan Cup
Logan Cup
Logan Cup
Logan Cup